The University of Florida's (UF) online clinical toxicology distance education programs cater to working professionals, including physicians, nurses, physician assistants, first responders, and poison control center professionals. The programs focus on toxicants, drugs of abuse, drug analysis, and biotransformation, as well as the treatment of poisoned or overdosed patients. Classes are taught by internationally recognized faculty with expertise in clinical toxicology, medicine, pharmacy, and pharmacology.

Each course within UF's program is conducted online and is made up of specific topic modules. Most modules contain course notes supplemented with images, animations, and case studies. Students are provided constant access to course modules, which are released over the duration of the UF semester.

Degree and certificate programs currently offered

UF currently offers one Master of Science (MS) program and one graduate certificate in clinical toxicology.

Degree programs

 MS in Clinical Toxicology

Certificate programs

 Clinical Toxicology

Degree programs

Master of Science in Clinical Toxicology
The clinical toxicology master's degree program consists of 32 credits and is designed for health science professionals who wish to expand their knowledge in the medical and toxicological principles of toxicants, drugs of abuse, drug biotransformation, analysis of drugs, and treatment approaches to the poisoned or overdosed patient.

Common student backgrounds: poison control center professionals, pharmacists, nurses, physicians, physician assistants, emergency medical assistants, and first responders.

Certificate programs

Clinical Toxicology
The certificate in clinical toxicology is provided by the UF College of Pharmacy. The certificate is considered a graduate level certificate or a post bachelor graduate certificate.  It consists of 15 credits offered entirely online. The certificate is designed to give health science professionals a background in the medical and toxicological principles of toxicants commonly encountered in poison control centers and emergency departments. A bachelor's degree in a health, health related or science related field is required before prospective students can enter the certificate program.

Recognitions

 Program director Dr. Ian Tebbett, Ph.D., was awarded the Irving Award by American Distance Education Consortium (ADEC) in 2011 and the 2010 Outstanding Leadership Award by the U.S. Distance Learning Association.

About the University of Florida

 The University of Florida is the fourth largest academic institution in the US. It is accredited by both the Southern Association of Colleges and Schools (SACS) and the Association of American Universities (AAU).
 UF enrolls more than 6,500 distance students and has more than 330,000 alumni throughout the world.

See also

 University of Florida: Forensic Science Distance Education Programs
 University of Florida pharmaceutical chemistry distance education program

References

External links
 UF Clinical Toxicology Online Graduate Program – University of Florida Clinical Toxicology website.
 UF Distance Learning – University of Florida distance learning website.
 University of Florida – Official website of the University of Florida.

University of Florida
Distance education institutions based in the United States
2010 establishments in Florida